Robert Gijsbertus Hartoch (24 March 1947 — 28 May 2009) was a Dutch chess International Master (1971).

Biography
Robert Hartoch has made the most of his success in junior chess tournaments. In 1964, in Groningen he together with Jørn Sloth won European Junior Chess Championship, but in 1965, in Barcelona he won silver medal in World Junior Chess Championship behind winner Bojan Kurajica.

After the junior age, the Robert Hartoch's results of chess tournaments became mediocre. He was a multiple participant in the Dutch Chess Championship, but failed to advance to more than 4th place in these tournaments (twice in 1972, 1975). His success in international chess tournaments was rare. In 1968, Robert Hartoch shared 2nd-3rd place with Anatoly Lutikov in the IBM international chess tournament.  In 1971, he shared 2nd-3rd place with András Adorján in the B tournament of the Hoogovens Wijk aan Zee Chess Festival. In 1991, in Dieren he was ranked 3rd in the Open Chess tournament.

Robert Hartoch played for Netherlands in the Chess Olympiads:
 In 1970, at second reserve board in the 19th Chess Olympiad in Siegen (+3, =5, -1),
 In 1972, at first reserve board in the 20th Chess Olympiad in Skopje (+5, =7, -2).

Robert Hartoch played for Netherlands in the European Team Chess Championship:
 In 1965, at second reserve board in the 3rd European Team Chess Championship in Hamburg (+0, =3, -3).

Robert Hartoch played for Netherlands in the Clare Benedict Chess Cups:
 In 1970, at first reserve board in the 17th Clare Benedict Chess Cup in Paignton (+0, =3, -0),
 In 1972, at third board in the 19th Clare Benedict Chess Cup in Vienna (+2, =3, -0) and won team silver and individual gold medals,
 In 1973, at fourth board in the 20th Clare Benedict Chess Cup in Gstaad (+1, =4, -1),
 In 1974, at first reserve board in the 21st Clare Benedict Chess Cup in Cala Galdana (+0, =4, -0).

In 1971, he was awarded the FIDE International Master (IM) title.

References

External links

Robert Hartoch chess games at 365chess.com

1947 births
2009 deaths
Sportspeople from Amsterdam
Dutch chess players
Chess International Masters
Chess Olympiad competitors
20th-century chess players
20th-century Dutch people
21st-century Dutch people